The men's softball tournament at the 2019 Pan American Games in Lima, Peru will be held between 25 July and 1 August 2019. Six nations will participate.

Qualification

Men
A total of five nations qualified to compete. The host nation, Peru, automatically qualified.

Canada, which has won every gold medal in this event at the Pan American Games, failed to qualify for the tournament.

Results 
All times are in Peru Time. (UTC−5)

Preliminary round 

Home team in each game is listed first.

Medal round

Semifinals

Final

Grand Final

References 

Men